Bettina Falk Hansen (born 31 March 1981) is a Danish former football defender. She played for Brøndby IF and the Danish women's national team. Falk quit international and club football at the age of 27 in June 2008, having made 116 appearances for Brøndby.

References

External links
Danish Football Union (DBU) statistics

1981 births
Living people
Danish women's footballers
Denmark women's international footballers
Brøndby IF (women) players
Women's association football defenders
2007 FIFA Women's World Cup players